CGS-13767 is an anxiolytic GABA receptor ligand.

References

Anxiolytics
GABAA receptor positive allosteric modulators